Tavion Thomas (born May 22, 2000) is an American football running back who played for the Utah Utes. Thomas is entering the 2023 NFL draft.

High school career
Thomas attended Dunbar High School in Dayton, Ohio. As a senior he rushed for 1,663 yards with 24 touchdowns. He committed to the University of Cincinnati to play college football.

College career
Thomas played 2018 and 2019 at Cincinnati. In his two years he rushed for 689 yards on 129 carries with seven touchdowns. In 2020 he transferred to Independence Community College. He rushed for 347 yards with five touchdowns in his lone season at Independence. In 2021, Thomas transferred to the University of Utah. He started four of 13 games his first year at Utah, leading the team with 1,108 yards on 204 carries with a school record 21 touchdowns. Thomas returned to Utah for 2022 rather than enter the 2022 NFL Draft.

References

External links
Utah Utes bio

Living people
Players of American football from Ohio
American football running backs
Cincinnati Bearcats football players
Independence Pirates football players
Utah Utes football players
2000 births